Sarcorrhiza is a genus of flowering plants belonging to the family Apocynaceae.

Its native range is Ivory Coast, Congo, Eastern Tanzania.

Species
Species:
 Sarcorrhiza epiphytica Bullock

References

Apocynaceae
Apocynaceae genera